The Wittman Big X is a four seat high wing variant of the Wittman Buttercup. The aircraft received serious attention from both Fairchild Aircraft, and Cessna Aircraft in the post World War II aviation boom.

Development
On a cross-country fuel stop at Hagerstown, Maryland, with Wittman's design, the Buttercup, Fairchild engineers expressed an interest in the design and even entered into negotiations for possible production of the aircraft. With the onset of World War II, production plans were shelved, but Fairchild contacted Wittman and proposed that a four-seat version would be marketable. Wittman designed the four-place "Big X" soon afterward.

When Fairchild did not follow up on production offers, Wittman was contacted by Cessna in Wichita, Kansas, to demonstrate the lightweight and strong spring steel landing gear of the Big X. Cessna bought the plane and its production rights in order to use the gear on its new Cessna 195 taildragger. Wittman later produced an updated version in a two-place configuration called the Wittman Tailwind that became a popular homebuilt aircraft.

Design
The Big X was built in the same manner as Buttercup. It was steel tube fuselage with fabric covering and all-wood wings. The original Big X featured a 130 hp Franklin engine, later upgraded to a 150 hp.

Operational history
Big X was used as a companion plane and baggage hauler during Wittman's years as an air racer. The original aircraft was rebuilt by Forrest Lovley in 1980.

Specifications Wittman Big X

Notes

References

Homebuilt aircraft
Big X
Aircraft first flown in 1945
Single-engined tractor aircraft
United States sport aircraft
High-wing aircraft